The 1995 NBA Finals was the championship round of the 1994–95 National Basketball Association (NBA) season. The series pitted the Eastern Conference champion Orlando Magic against the defending NBA champion and  Western Conference champion Houston Rockets. The pre-series hype and buildup of the Finals was centered on the meeting of the two centers opposing each other: Shaquille O'Neal of the Magic and Hakeem Olajuwon of the Rockets. Going into the series the matchup was compared to the Bill Russell–Wilt Chamberlain matchup of the 1960s.

The Rockets became the first team in NBA history to beat four 50-win teams in a single postseason en route to the championship. The Rockets would win a playoff-record nine road games in the 1995 playoffs. It was the second NBA Finals sweep in the 2–3–2 Finals format (after the Detroit Pistons did so against the Los Angeles Lakers in 1989). The Rockets also became the first repeat NBA Champion in history to keep the title with a sweep. In addition, the Rockets became the first team in NBA history to win the title without having home-court advantage in any of the four playoff rounds since the playoffs was expanded to a 16 team format in 1984. Coincidentally, this feat would also be achieved in the NHL by the New Jersey Devils that same year, when they won the Stanley Cup over the Detroit Red Wings.

The Orlando Magic, making their first NBA Finals appearance, began the series at home, hosting the defending champion Houston Rockets. With the Magic up 110–107 late in Game 1, Nick Anderson missed four consecutive free throws in the closing seconds of the game, and Kenny Smith hit a three-pointer, tying the game and sending it to overtime as well as setting a new record at the time, with the most three-pointers in an NBA Finals game with seven. The more experienced Rockets went on to win in overtime and eventually swept the Magic, winning their second consecutive NBA Championship. In achieving this, they earned the distinction of being the only team to win both championships during Michael Jordan's first retirement (although Jordan did return in the closing months of the 1994–95 season), in addition to being the only team other than the Chicago Bulls to win multiple championships in the 1990s.

The season-ending documentary Double Clutch by Hal Douglas, was released by NBA Entertainment to coincide with the Rockets' championship season.

Background

Houston Rockets

The Rockets entered the 1994–95 season as defending champions. They had won their first eight games of the season, the first defending champions to have won their first eight games of their season since the 1987-88 Lakers. However, they struggled to maintain last season's form due to injuries and off-court-distractions. On February 14, the Rockets acquired Clyde Drexler from the Portland Trail Blazers, but the trade of a hometown hero (Drexler was a teammate of Olajuwon at the University of Houston) did not improve matters, and the Rockets settled for the sixth seed with a 47–35 record.

However, Houston once again lived up to its Clutch City reputation come playoff time. En route to the Finals, the Rockets defeated three teams with 55 or more victories. They began by ousting the Utah Jazz in five games (the Rockets trailed 2–1 after three games), then repeating last season's comeback effort over the Phoenix Suns (wherein the Rockets trailed 3–1 after four games). In Game 7 of that series, Phoenix led Houston 51-42 after the first half before Houston mounted a comeback to get the series win, 115-114. After dispatching the Suns, the Rockets outclassed the top-seeded San Antonio Spurs in six games of the conference finals. They also became the first team in NBA History to have lost all their home games of the series but won all road games of that certain series thus advancing to the next round.

Orlando Magic

The Magic were only in their sixth season of existence, but they were a team on the rise. Led by All-Stars Shaquille O'Neal and Penny Hardaway, new acquisition Horace Grant, and franchise cornerstones Nick Anderson and Dennis Scott, the Magic rolled through the Eastern Conference, winding up with a then-franchise best 57–25 mark.

Orlando's road to the Finals began with a convincing 3–1 series win over the Boston Celtics. They followed it up with a six-game ouster of Michael Jordan (returning from an 18-month retirement) and the Chicago Bulls in the second round, and in the conference finals, they vanquished the Indiana Pacers in a tough seven-game series.

Road to the Finals

Regular season series
The Orlando Magic won both games in the regular season series:

1995 NBA Finals rosters

Houston Rockets

Orlando Magic

Series summary

This was one of only two NBA Finals in which the team who did not have home court advantage swept the series, (the other being the 1975 Finals, in which the Golden State Warriors swept the Washington Bullets).

All times are in Eastern Daylight Time (UTC−4).

Game 1

Orlando led 110-107 with 10.5 seconds left, when Nick Anderson was intentionally fouled to send him to the free-throw line. Normally a respectable free-throw shooter (70.4 percent in the regular season), Anderson missed both of his free throws, but was able to grab the offensive rebound after the second miss and was fouled again. Anderson shockingly missed the next two free throws, and Houston grabbed the rebound, and would tie the game with 1.6 seconds left on Kenny Smith's 3-point shot. The shot was one of Smith's seven made 3-point shots, setting a then-Finals record. In overtime, Hakeem Olajuwon tipped in a missed finger roll by Clyde Drexler with three-tenths of a second left to win the game. Hakeem Olajuwon finished the game with 31 points, 6 rebounds, 7 assists and 4 blocks while Kenny Smith recorded 23 points and 9 assists. The four consecutive missed free-throws by Nick Anderson would haunt him for the rest of his career. After the Finals, Anderson would shoot only 60.5% on free-throws for the rest of his career.

Game 2

Hakeem Olajuwon recorded a double-double with 34 points and 11 rebounds to lead the Rockets to a 117-106 victory and a 2-0 series lead. The Magic, on the other hand, became the 2nd team in NBA Finals history to lose the first two of their four home games.

Game 3

Robert Horry hit a three-pointer to give Houston a 104-100 lead with 14.1 seconds left.  Orlando's Anfernee Hardaway then missed a three-pointer, and the rebound deflected off Dennis Scott and out of bounds with 6.8 seconds left, turning the ball over to Houston.  Clyde Drexler was immediately fouled.  He missed his first free throw and made the second for a 105-100 Rockets lead with 5.9 seconds left.  Nick Anderson hit a three-pointer with 2.7 seconds left to bring the Magic within two points, and then Sam Cassell was immediately fouled.  He needed to make both free throws to likely seal it, but missed the first. He made the second to give the Rockets a three-point lead with 2.2 seconds left.  After a timeout to advance the ball to midcourt, the Magic had one last chance to tie the game and force overtime, but Hardaway missed a three-pointer as the buzzer sounded.  The Rockets held on for a 106-103 win in Game 3 to take a 3-0 series lead and were one win away from their second consecutive NBA title.

Game 4

At the end of the first half, the Magic had a 4-point advantage of the home team, Rockets. However, the Rockets have another notable comeback as they outscored the Magic 66-50 in the second half, thus winning their second consecutive NBA championship. Olajuwon outscores O'Neal by 10 points and caps off the sweep by hitting a memorable yet uncharacteristic 3-pointer in front of O'Neal. When accepting the Larry O'Brien Trophy on the floor of The Summit, Rockets head coach Rudy Tomjanovich said "Don't ever underestimate the heart of a champion!" Olajuwon, with his 35 point and 15 rebound performance, was named Finals MVP for the second straight year.

Olajuwon v. O'Neal
Although both centers played well, Olajuwon outscored O'Neal in every game of the series and became one of the few players in NBA history to score at least 30 points in every game of an NBA Finals series:

By winning his second straight NBA Finals MVP award, Hakeem Olajuwon became the sixth player to win the award on multiple occasions, joining Willis Reed, Kareem Abdul-Jabbar, Magic Johnson, Larry Bird, and Michael Jordan. Jordan and Olajuwon at the time were the only players to win the award consecutively.

Player statistics

Houston Rockets

|-
| align="left" |  || 4 || 0 || 9.5 || .455 || .000 || 1.000 || 2.8 || 0.0 || 0.0 || 0.5 || 3.0 
|-
| align="left" |  || 4 || 0 || 23.3 || .429 || .467 || .833 || 1.8 || 3.0 || 1.8 || 0.0 || 14.3 
|-
| align="left" |  || 3 || 0 || 1.0 || .000 || .000 || .000 || 0.0 || 0.0 || 0.0 || 0.0 || 0.0 
|-
| align="left" |  || 4 || 4 || 40.5 || .450 || .154 || .789 || 9.5 || 6.8 || 1.0 || 0.3 || 21.5 
|-
| align="left" |  || 4 || 4 || 40.3 || .649 || .571 || .900 || 4.3 || 3.3 || 2.0 || 0.0 || 16.3 
|-
| align="left" |  || 4 || 4 || 46.8 || .434 || .379 || .667 || 10.0 || 3.8 || 3.0 || 2.3 || 17.8 
|-
| align="left" |  || 4 || 0 || 14.3 || .500 || .000 || 1.000 || 1.8 || 0.0 || 0.0 || 0.0 || 1.0 
|-! style="background:#FDE910;"
| align="left" |  || 4 || 4 || 44.8 || .483 || 1.000 || .692 || 11.5 || 5.5 || 2.0 || 2.0 || 32.8 
|-
| align="left" |  || 4 || 4 || 26.3 || .379 || .421 || .000 || 1.8 || 4.0 || 0.3 || 0.0 || 7.5 

Orlando Magic

|-
| align="left" |  || 4 || 4 || 40.3 || .360 || .323 || .300 || 8.5 || 4.3 || 2.0 || 0.5 || 12.3 
|-
| align="left" |  || 4 || 0 || 6.5 || .600 || .500 || .000 || 0.5 || 1.5 || 0.0 || 0.3 || 3.3 
|-
| align="left" |  || 4 || 4 || 42.0 || .532 || .000 || .800 || 12.0 || 1.5 || 0.5 || 0.5 || 13.5 
|-
| align="left" |  || 4 || 4 || 43.0 || .500 || .458 || .913 || 4.8 || 8.0 || 1.0 || 0.8 || 25.5 
|-
| align="left" |  || 4 || 4 || 45.0 || .595 || .000 || .571 || 12.5 || 6.3 || 0.3 || 2.5 || 28.0 
|-
| align="left" |  || 1 || 0 || 1.0 || .000 || .000 || .000 || 0.0 || 0.0 || 0.0 || 0.0 || 0.0 
|-
| align="left" |  || 4 || 4 || 37.5 || .310 || .241 || 1.000 || 3.5 || 2.3 || 1.0 || 0.3 || 10.5 
|-
| align="left" |  || 4 || 0 || 21.0 || .426 || .385 || .000 || 3.3 || 3.3 || 0.5 || 0.3 || 12.5 
|-
| align="left" |  || 4 || 0 || 10.8 || .200 || .333 || .000 || 1.0 || 0.5 || 0.0 || 0.0 || 1.5

Media coverage
In the United States, the NBA Finals was broadcast on NBC television, with Marv Albert, Matt Guokas and Bill Walton calling the action. Ahmad Rashad, Hannah Storm, and Jim Gray served as sideline reporters, and studio coverage was handled by Bob Costas, Julius Erving and Peter Vecsey.

National radio coverage was provided by the NBA Radio Network, with Joe McConnell and Wes Unseld on the call. After the season, NBA Radio was dissolved and subsequent national radio broadcasts of the NBA Finals would be handled by ESPN Radio.

Aftermath
The Rockets' title reign ended in 1996, when they were swept by the Seattle SuperSonics in the second round. The Sonics were also the last team to beat the Rockets in the playoffs prior to their championship run, having eliminated them in the second round in 1993. That year, the Rockets won 48 games and achieved the fourth seed. The following offseason, they acquired former NBA MVP Charles Barkley in a trade, but age and injuries would take its toll and the closest the Rockets would achieve after their two-year championship reign was a six-game loss to the Utah Jazz in the 1997 Western Conference Finals.

The Magic won a franchise-record 60 games in the 1995–96 NBA season, but were swept by the Chicago Bulls in the 1996 Eastern Conference Finals. The Magic would not return to the Finals until , which they lost to the Lakers in five games.

References

External links
 

National Basketball Association Finals
Finals
NBA
NBA
Basketball competitions in Houston
Basketball competitions in Orlando, Florida
1995 in sports in Florida
1995 in sports in Texas
1995 in Houston
1990s in Orlando, Florida
June 1995 sports events in the United States
GMA Network television specials